Dmitriy Lomakin (born 25 February 1976) is a Kazakhstani weightlifter. He competed in the men's featherweight event at the 2000 Summer Olympics.

References

1976 births
Living people
Kazakhstani male weightlifters
Olympic weightlifters of Kazakhstan
Weightlifters at the 2000 Summer Olympics
Place of birth missing (living people)
Asian Games medalists in weightlifting
Weightlifters at the 1998 Asian Games
Asian Games silver medalists for Kazakhstan
Medalists at the 1998 Asian Games
20th-century Kazakhstani people
21st-century Kazakhstani people